Nest of Winds is a 1979 Estonian drama film directed by Olav Neuland.

Awards:
 1980: All-Union Film Festival (USSR), best director debut: Olav Neuland
 1980: Karlovy Vary International Film Festival (Czech), First award to "Tuulte pesa" (debut prize)

Plot

Cast
 Rudolf Allabert - Jüri Piir, host of Mahtjamäe farm
 Nelli Taar - Roosi Piir, his spouse
 Arvo Iho - Juhan Piir, their son
 Anne Maasik - Liisa Piir, Juhan's wife
 Indrek Korb - Margus Piir, son of Liisa Piir
 Evald Aavik - Foreigner
 Tõnu Kark - Tiit Paljasmaa
 Vaino Vahing - Forest Brother
 Ain Lutsepp - Forest Brother

References

External links
 
 Tuulte pesa, entry in Estonian Film Database (EFIS)

1979 films
Estonian drama films
Estonian-language films